An election to Dublin City Council took place on 5 June 2009 as part of that year's Irish local elections. 52 councillors were elected from thirteen electoral divisions by PR-STV voting for a five-year term of office.

Results by party

Results by Electoral Area

Artane-Whitehall

Ballyfermot-Drimnagh

Ballymun-Finglas

Cabra-Glasnevin

Clontarf

Crumlin-Kimmage

Donaghmede

North Inner City

Pembroke-Rathmines

South-East Inner City

South-West Inner City

External links
 https://www.housing.gov.ie/sites/default/files/migrated-files/en/Publications/LocalGovernment/Voting/FileDownLoad,23415,en.pdf
 Official website
 https://irishelectionliterature.com/others-project/old-local-election-results/
 http://irelandelection.com/council.php?elecid=175&tab=constit&detail=yes&electype=5&councilid=7&electype=5

Dublin City Council election
2009
City Council election, 2009
Dublin City Council election
Dublin City Council election